Roy West (31 March 1941 – 19 November 2011) was an Australian rules footballer for the Geelong Football Club in the Victorian Football League (VFL) during the 1960s.

West was a fullback and won the 1961 Carji Greeves Medal for Geelong's best and fairest player. 

On 6 July 1963 he was a member of the Geelong team that were comprehensively and unexpectedly beaten by Fitzroy, 9.13 (67) to 3.13 (31) in the 1963 Miracle Match. He was a premiership player in 1963 and represented Victoria at interstate football.

Following a year-long battle with lung cancer, West died in a Ballarat hospital on 19 November 2011, aged 70.

See also
 1963 Miracle Match

References

External links

1941 births
Australian rules footballers from Victoria (Australia)
Geelong Football Club players
Geelong Football Club Premiership players
Stawell Football Club players
Carji Greeves Medal winners
2011 deaths
Deaths from lung cancer
One-time VFL/AFL Premiership players